The First Ganzouri Cabinet was led by Egyptian prime minister Kamal Ganzouri from 2 January 1996 to 5 October 1999.

List of Ministers

Quelle:

References

Cabinets of Egypt
1996 establishments in Egypt
1999 disestablishments in Egypt
Cabinets established in 1996
Cabinets disestablished in 1999